This article shows 2010–11 statistics of individual players for the football club F.C. Copenhagen. It also lists all matches that F.C. Copenhagen played in the 2010–11 season.

Players

Squad information
This section show the squad as currently, considering all players who are confirmedly moved in and out (see section Players in / out).

Squad stats

Starting 11 
This section shows the most used players for each position considering a 4-4-2 formation.

Players in / out

In

Out

Club

Coaching staff

Kit

|
|
|
|
|

Other information

Competitions

Overall

Danish Superliga

Classification

Results summary

Results by round

UEFA Champions League

Third qualifying round

Play-off round

Group D

Classification

Results by round

Round of 16

Results summary

Matches

Competitive

References

External links
 F.C. Copenhagen official website

2010-11
Danish football clubs 2010–11 season
2010–11 UEFA Champions League participants seasons